The Ministry of Defence and National Security is the ministry of Fiji responsible for advising the government on strategic leadership, policy guidance and overseeing the Republic of the Fiji Military Forces. The current Minister for Defence and National Security is Pio Tikoduadua who was appointed to the position in December 2022.

Responsibilities 
The Ministry is tasked in managing the nation's security and it does this through policies, programmes and projects. The ministry is also tasked in maintaining public order and responding to national emergencies. Other responsibilities include aerial surveillance and search and rescue.

See also 

 Republic of Fiji Military Forces

References 

Government of Fiji
Government ministries of Fiji